Rome plows were large, specially modified armored bulldozers used in South Vietnam by the United States military during the Vietnam War.

Background 
The plows took their name from the city of Rome, Georgia, where they were made by the Rome Plow Company (now located in Cedartown, Georgia).

The plow tractors were equipped with a very sharp "stinger blade" which weighed more than two tons and was able to cut down trees, which were then burned. When fully equipped, a Rome plow tractor weighed  without the rome plow kit. Rome plows were mounted on Caterpillar D7E bulldozers of the 59th, 60th, 501st, 538th, 687th, and 984th Engineer Companies (Land Clearing).

Deployment 
Rome plows were first used in III Corps (Military Region III) to destroy trees and other jungle flora that could be used by enemy forces. Major land clearance operations did not commence, however, until May 1967 with the arrival of the 169th Engineer Battalion.

The plows were assigned a tank platoon and an infantry company for security. These would, prior to plowing operations, send preparatory machinegun, mortar, and 90mm tank guns into the forests and jungles; subsequent fire was continuously directed into uncleared areas to deter ambushes while the Rome plows performed their task.  A search team, consisting of an infantry platoon and a squad of engineers, was also on hand to destroy any enemy installations, such as camps and tunnels,  that were encountered, as well as to gather information.

Legality 
Richard Falk, a professor of international law and a prominent opponent of the war, wrote in 1973: "I think it is not easy to conclude that Rome plowing, however much it offends ecological consciousness, constitutes a violation of existing standards of international law." Citing post-World War II indictments against nine German officials who had overseen "the wholesale cutting of Polish timber to an extent far in excess of what was necessary to preserve the timber resources of the country", however, he also concluded that "it is possible to view such environmental devastation as an instance of 'a crime against humanity' in the Nuremberg sense".

Popular Culture 
The American rock band Drive Like Jehu's 1994 album Yank Crime contains a song entitled "Here Come the Rome Plows."

See also 
 Armored bulldozer
 Caterpillar D9

Notes

Sources

External links
Histories for Landclearing Engineers - Vietnam 1967-71: Jungle Eaters & Rome Plow Companies
Jungle Eaters
538th Landclearing Company
59th Landclearing Company
Rome Plow Company

Military equipment of the Vietnam War
Rome, Georgia
Armored fighting vehicles of the United States
Polk County, Georgia